Andreas Plückthun (born May 7, 1956) is a scientist whose research is focused on the field of protein engineering. Andreas Plückthun is the director of the department of biochemistry at the University of Zurich. Plückthun was appointed to the faculty of the University of Zurich as a Full professor of biochemistry in 1993. Plückthun was group leader at the Max Planck Institute of Biochemistry , Germany (1985-1993). He was elected to the European Molecular Biology Organization (EMBO) in 1992, and named a member of the German National Academy of Science (Leopoldina) in 2003. He is cofounder of the biotechnology companies Morphosys (Martinsried, Germany) Molecular Partners AG (Zürich-Schlieren, Switzerland) and G7 Therapeutics. (Zürich-Schlieren, Switzerland).

Plückthun is a member of the board directors of the Antibody Society.

His work is highly cited in the field of antibody engineering. He has been honoured by a number of international awards.

Biography 

Andreas Plückthun was born in Heidelberg (Germany) and is married to Ilse Pfitzinger, together they have one daughter. He studied chemistry at the University of Heidelberg. He received his PhD degree at the University of California at San Diego with Edward Dennis, the title of his dissertation being "The interfacial catalysis of phospholipase A2". He was a post-doctoral fellow at Harvard University with Jeremy Knowles, where he worked on the secretion process of beta-lactamase in Escherichia coli. In 1985, he became group leader at the Gene Center Munich, then located at the Max-Planck-Institute for Biochemistry in Martinsried (Germany). In 1993 he was appointed Full Professor of Biochemistry at the University of Zurich (Switzerland).

Work 

His research contributed to enabling the emergence of antibody engineering, notably by the use of E. coli as an engineering platform and studies on synthetic antibodies which led to the first fully synthetic antibody library. To create a true in vitro protein evolution technology his laboratory developed ribosome display of whole proteins. In his research group Designed Ankyrin Repeat Proteins (DARPins) were created as a robust alternative scaffold for binding proteins (antibody mimetics). DARPins are derived from naturally occurring ankyrin proteins, a protein class that mediates high-affinity protein-protein interactions in nature. DARPins (Designed Ankyrin Repeat Proteins), one of the most common binding proteins in nature and responsible for diverse functions, such as cell signaling and receptor binding. To obtain highly stable G protein-coupled receptors that can be used for structural studies and in drug screening, his research group developed new directed evolution technologies.

Honors and awards

He won a Young Investigator's Award of the German Chemical Industry Trust (Fonds der chemischen Industrie). In 2000, he received the Karl-Heinz-Beckurts Award (Munich, Germany). In 2002 he was given the J. P. Morgan Chase Health Award (San Jose, CA, USA), the Wilhelm-Exner Medal (Vienna, Austria) and The Jury's Grand Prix (European Grand Prix for Innovation, Monaco). Together with the other founders of Molecular Partners AG, he received the Swiss Technology Award and the De Vigier Award in 2005. In 2011 he was awarded a Senior Investigator Grant of the European Research Council. He is the recipient of the 2016 Christian B. Anfinsen Award.

Appearances 
In December 2018, Plückthun spoke at the 'Antibody Engineering and Therapeutics' conference in San Diego, California.

References

External links 

The Plückthun Lab
List of publications Andreas Plückthun
 Publication list A. Plückthun ResearchGate
Department of Biochemistry, University of Zurich
University of Zurich
Morphosys AG
Molecular Partners AG
G7 Therapeutics
Antibody Society
Google Scholar

Swiss biochemists
Members of the European Molecular Biology Organization
University of California, San Diego alumni
Studienstiftung alumni
1956 births
German biochemists
Academic staff of the University of Zurich
Heidelberg University alumni
Living people